The Institute for the International Education of Students, or IES Abroad, is a non-profit study abroad organization that administers study abroad programs for U.S. college-aged students. Founded in 1950 as the Institute of European Studies, the organization has since been renamed to reflect additional offerings in Africa, Asia, Oceania, and Latin America. The organization now provides more than 125+ programs in 19 countries and 33 cities. Over 150,000 students have studied abroad on IES Abroad programs since its founding, with more than 10,000 students studying abroad each year.

IES Abroad has an Academic Consortium composed of over 200 academic institutions.  It offers over $6 million in scholarships to help finance qualified students abroad.  In accordance with its mission and vision statement, IES Abroad highlights cultural immersion through the use of homestays and field trips to "[promote] the development of interculturally-competent leaders."  IES Abroad's services include pre-departure advising, visa assistance, alumni mentors, and safety plans at Centers abroad.  IES Abroad has a diversity initiative and a green initiative.

History 

IES Abroad offered its first program in September 1950, when Paul Koutny, an Austrian student living in the U.S. on a Fulbright scholarship, brought American students to live and study in Vienna, Austria for a year.  Two of the students from the original program, newlyweds Clarence and Alberta Giese, returned after the program inspired to help other students study abroad. From their Chicago home, they worked with Koutny to recruit more students and send them abroad.

William Louis Gaines, the son of a railroad worker who served in World War II and marched with Martin Luther King Jr., served as president of IES from 1974 until his 1992 retirement "through some of its most challenging years".
 
IES Abroad developed a Model Assessment Practice  in 1999 as a framework for the design, development, and evaluation of programs of study abroad.  This program formed the basis for the standards of the Forum on Education Abroad adopted by the field.  In 2010, IES Abroad was the first third-party provider to receive the Forum on Education Abroad's Category 2b Quality Improvement Designation, which involves independent reviewers using evaluation systems to make program improvements.

Notable alumni

Amanda Gorman
Donald Hopkins
Willard Huyck
John Irving
Michael Isikoff
Meghan Markle
Charles E. Merrill Jr.
David Muir
Janet Napolitano
Sonia Nazario
Adrienne S. O'Neal
Mark Kennedy Shriver
Daniel Quinn

See also
NAFSA: Association of International Educators
Institute of International Education
Forum on education abroad
Study abroad in the United States
Study abroad organization

References

External links
 IES Abroad website
 IES Abroad's Study Abroad Photo of the Day
 Diversity Abroad

Non-profit organizations based in Chicago
International educational organizations
Study abroad programs
1950 establishments in the United States
Organizations established in 1950
501(c)(3) organizations